Branislav Kubka (born August 15, 1988) is a Slovak professional ice hockey player. He is currently playing for HKM Zvolen of the Tipsport Liga.

Kubka made his Czech Extraliga debut playing with HC Plzeň during the 2013-14 Czech Extraliga season.

Awards and honors

References

External links

 

1988 births
Living people
People from Detva District
Sportspeople from the Banská Bystrica Region
Slovak ice hockey defencemen
HC 07 Detva players
HC '05 Banská Bystrica players
HC Karlovy Vary players
HC Baník Sokolov players
HC Plzeň players
HK Nitra players
HKM Zvolen players
Slovak expatriate ice hockey players in the Czech Republic